Calliotropis canaliculata is a species of sea snail, a marine gastropod mollusk in the family Eucyclidae.

Description
The shell can grow to 6.5 mm in length.

Distribution
This marine species occurs off Queensland and New South Wales, Australia.

References

 Vilvens C. (2007) New records and new species of Calliotropis from Indo-Pacific. Novapex 8 (Hors Série 5): 1–72.

External links

canaliculata
Gastropods described in 1994